Nerus Ginting Suka (1898 – 12 March 1955) was a member of the People's Representative Council from 1950 until 1955, and the candidate for the Vice President of Indonesia in the 1950 vice presidential election.

Nerus was active in the political movements for the independence of Indonesia from 1920 until 1931. During this period, he established the Batak Karo Association in 1924, and joined the Indonesian National Party in 1930. His further activities caused him to be exiled in Boven-Digoel several times. During the Japanese occupation, he was freed, but later imprisoned again. During this time, he led the recruitment for the Heiho auxiliary soldiers in the Karo area.

After the independence of Indonesia, Nerus returned to his hometown, Kabanjahe, which at that time was in the State of East Sumatra. He was appointed as the head of the information affairs in Berastagi in 1947, and later as the member of the People's Representative Council of the United States of Indonesia in 1949, representing East Sumatra. After the dissolution of the parliament, he was seated in the Provisional People's Representative Council, as a member from the National People's Party.

In the vice presidential election on 14 October 1950, Nerus nominated himself as a candidate. He only obtained 1 vote (allegedly from himself).

During his term as a member of parliament, Nerus submitted a motion, along with other four members from the Democratic faction. The motion urged the government to give priority to the defense law over the other defenses, which, according to the initiators of the motion, are merely a consequence of the said main law. The motion furthermore calls for the discussion of the 5 bills concerning the army, which are currently being discussed, to be postponed pending the defense law.

Nerus died on the night of 12 March 1955 at the Central Civil Hospital in Jakarta. He was buried at a public graveyard in Medan.

After his death, the party nominated Bena Sitepu Pandebesi as his replacement. Pandebesi was inaugurated as the member of the People's Representative Council on 16 June 1955.

Bibliography

References 

1898 births
1955 deaths
Indonesian collaborators with Imperial Japan
Members of the People's Representative Council, 1950
People from Karo Regency